The 1970 Grand National was the 124th renewal of the Grand National horse race that took place at Aintree near Liverpool, England, on 4 April 1970. Gay Trip won the race by 20 lengths, giving jockey Pat Taaffe his second winner. Only seven horses finished the race and Racoon was a fatality at the 3rd fence.

Finishing order

Non-finishers

Media coverage

David Coleman presented the eleventh Grand National Grandstand (his tenth) on the BBC. Peter O'Sullevan and Julian Wilson were the two commentators - Wilson commentating from the first fence to the Anchor Bridge crossing.

References

 1970
Grand National
Grand National
20th century in Lancashire
April 1970 sports events in the United Kingdom